Henry Ashton may refer to:

Henry Ashton (architect) (1801–1872), British architect
Henry Ashton, 4th Baron Ashton of Hyde (born 1958), British peer
Henry Ashton (Governor of Antigua), Governor of Antigua 1640–1652
Henry Ashton (burgess) on List of members of the Virginia House of Burgesses

See also
Henry Aston (1759–1798), English cricketer
Harry Ashton (disambiguation)
Ashton (surname)